Dad Fatihana railway station is a disused railway station on the Karachi–Peshawar Railway Line located in Dad Fatihana village, Punjab, Pakistan. The station is located east of Chichawatni railway station and west of Harappa railway station.

See also
 List of railway stations in Pakistan
 Pakistan Railways

References

External links

Railway stations in Sahiwal District
Defunct railway stations in Pakistan